The following is a list of foreign players who played in the Primera División de Fútbol Profesional, a fully professional soccer league which existed in El Salvador between 1926 and 1998, prior to the restructure and change of format in 1998.

The listed players have played at least one official game for their respective clubs. Players in italic were born overseas but went on to be naturalised and in some cases played for the El Salvador national football team. Players in bold played for their national team.

Africa – CAF

Nigeria
 Charles Unaka – Alianza F.C. (1995)

Sierra Leone
 Abdul Thompson Conteh – Atlético Marte (1994–1995)

South America – CONMEBOL

Argentina
 Luis Cesar Condomi – C.D. Aguila (1974), Juventud Olímpica (1971-73), Atletico Marte (1978)
 José Emilio Mitrovich – C.D. Aguila (1984)
 Juan Carlos Veloso – C.D. Aguila (1985)
 Fabián Suchini – C.D. Aguila (1989–1990)
 Carlos Rubén Salas – C.D. Aguila (1989–1990)
 Daniel Messina  – C.D. Aguila (1993–1994)
 Gregorio Bundio – Atlético Marte (1952–1953), C.D. Dragón (1954–1955)
 Ariel Goldman  – C.D. Aguila (1993–1994)
 Raúl Forteis – ANTEL (1976), Alianza (1978–1980), Chalatenango (1979)
 Martin di Luca  – Alianza (1993–1994)
 Hugo Neira  – Alianza (1993–1994)
 Sergio Bufarini – Alianza (1993–1994)
 Hugo Sigliano – Alianza 
 Óscar "Nene" Escalante – Atletico Marte (1978–1979)
 Alfredo di Maio – Atletico Marte (1978–1979)
 Miguel Ángel "Trucutú" Martínez – Atletico Marte (1978–1979), Chalatenango (1988–1989)
 Arnaldo Luis Martínez – C.D. Chalatenango (1985–1987)
 Roberto López – FAS (1975)
 Enzo Graniello – FAS (1975)
 Domingo Albil – FAS (1970-72, 1974–1976), Sonsonate (1975-77)
 Agustín Balbuena –FAS (1977)
 Antonio Imbelloni – FAS (1955–1958)
 Héctor Pasaquiri – FAS (1968)
 Gabriel Perrone – FAS (1991–1995)
 Manolo Jovino Álvarez – UES (1970), LA Firpo (1970), FAS (1975–1976), (1981–1986), Once Municipal (1977),   Alianza (1986)
 Amado Abraham – C.D. FAS (1974–1975, 1976–1985)
 Hector Alcides Piccioni – C.D. FAS (1968–1980)
 Roberto Casadei – C.D. FAS (1974–1978)
 José Luis Cárdenas – C.D. FAS (1991–1992)
 Juan Manuel Villarreal – C.D. FAS (1991–1992)
 Nelson San Lorenzo – C.D. FAS (1965-1968), Exclesior (1971-72), ADLER
 Néstor Cataldo – C.D. FAS (1983)
 Dario Juarez – C.D. FAS (1989)
 Sergio Castellanos – C.D. FAS (1989)
 Carlos Álvarez – C.D. FAS (1989)
 Marcelo Bauzá – C.D. FAS (1995)
 Fulgencio Deonel Bordón – C.D. FAS (1995)
 Carlos Eduardo Martínez Sequeira – C.D. FAS, Once Lobos 
 Mariano Dalla Libera  – C.D. FAS (1986-1987)
 Ricardo Carreño – Once Lobos (1985)
 Roberto López – Once Municipal (1977–1978)
 Raúl Cocherari – UCA (1971), Tapachulteca (1975–1976), Once Municipal (1977–1978), Alianza (1979)
 Norberto Zafanella – ADLER, Platense (1975–1977)
 Roque Antonio 'Tony' Rojas – UES (1974–1975), Platense (1976–1978), Juventud Olímpica (1973)
 Nicolás Volpini – Platense  (1977–1978)
 Luis Secundino Páez – Fuerte Aguilares (1974), Platense  (1977–1979), Alianza,  C.D. FAS (1980)
 Rene Joaquin Cazalbón – UES (1971), Juventud Olímpica (1974–1975)
 Oswaldo Crosta – Once Municipal (1965–1968)
 Victor Donato – UES (1973–1976), Firpo (1976–1977)
 Bruno Ferrari – C.D. Dragón
 Nestor Doroni – C.D. Aguila (1988)
 Jorge Tripicchio – Fuerte Aguilares (1974), UES (1977-78)
 Miguel Ángel "Rata" Cobián – Negocios Internacionales (1974–1976)
 Kelerman – Juventud Olímpica
 Jorge Tripchio - Fuerte Aguilares (1976)
 Gerónimo Pericullo – Atlético Marte 
 Juan Bautista Pérez – Atlético Marte 
 Raúl ‘Pibe’ Vásquez – Leones FC (1966), Atlético Marte (1957, 1964), Aguila (1959-1960)
 Juan Andres Rios – Atlético Marte (1964, 1971), Limeno (1974)
 Carlos Alberto Chavano – Atlético Marte (1966)
 Hugo Ponce - C.D. Adler (1965)
 Hector Edmundo Abrita - Aguila (1973-74)
 Guillermo Fischer - TBD, Dragon (1978-79)
 Daniel Cacho Sosa - Juventud Olímpica
 Roberto Celestino - Independiente (1978)
 José Luis Giusti - Independiente (1978)
 Mariano del Olivera - TBD
 Hugo Luis Lencina - Juventud Olímpica (1969-71), Atletico Marte
 Ruben Bueno - Santiagueno
 Jose Alberto Volpe - Santiagueno
 Eduardo Space - Aguila (1966)
 Jorge Alberto Diz - Once Municipal (1965)
 Hector Mariano - FAS (1957-59)
 Jose Chingolo Rodriguez - FAS (1959)
 Hector Dadderio - FAS (1957-59)
 Alberto Cevasco - FAS (1957)
 Omar Muraco - FAS (1957)
 Javier Novello - FAS (1957)
 Hector Omar Cuco Lopez - FAS (1962)
 Alejandro Biegler - Cojutepeque (1987)
 Omar Chiodin - Juventud Olímpica
 Rodolfo Baello - Juventud Olímpica (1973), Atletico Marte (1964-65, 1971)
 Juan Quarterone - UES (1970-72)
 Jose Carlos Lupporini - ANTEL (1976)
 Planetti - Once Lobos (1979-80)
 Roberto Lopez - Once Municipal, FAS (1975)
 Mario Zanotti - Once Municipal (1977)
 Anselmo Marocchi – ADLER
 Oscar Tedini - Atletico Marte
 Eduardo Lamparelli - Atletico Marte
 Alejandro Juan Glomba - Aguila (1982)
 Salvador Azerrad - FAS (1985)
 Juan Carlos Conde  - Atletico Marte (1966)
 Marcelo Guitterez - Metapan FC (1991)
 Enrique Mendoza - Fuerte Aguilares (1974)
 Oscar Escalante - Atletico Marte (1978)

Brazil
 Ademir Barbosa Das Neves – C.D Santiagueño (1979), C.D. Águila (1974–1978)
 Pedro Damasco – C.D Santiagueño 
 Dorivaldo Becca – FAS (1967–1969)
 Carlos Alberto Seixas – Alianza F.C. (1990–91), C.D. FAS (1992–1993)
 Zizinho – FAS (1985–1987)
 Salvador Azerrad – FAS (1986–1987) 
 Candido de Asis- Once Lobos (1986–1987)
 Pedro Dacunha – Once Municipal
 Coutiñho - Sonsonate 
 Carlos Roberto Barboza – ANTEL, Once Municipal(1977–1978), Independiente (1979–1980)
 Edson Ferreira da Silva – Fuerte San Francisco (1992–1993)
 Justino da Silva –  Independiente (1979–1980)
 Pio da Silva – Firpo (1975)
 Carlos López Neves – Firpo (1976–1985) 
 Nelson de Moraes – Firpo (1975–1980), Alianza F.C. (1980-1981) 
 Ernesto Páez de Oliveira – Firpo (1980–1981) 
 Robson Mattos de Moura – Firpo(1986)
 Jorge Nunes – Firpo(1985–1986) 
 Joao Cabral Filho – Firpo (1986–1987) 
 Salvador Filho – Firpo (1986–1987), C.D. Aguila (1991–1992)
 Luis Ferreira – Firpo (1986–1987)
 Toninho Dos Santos – Firpo (1989–1991), C.D. Aguila (2002)
 Geraldo Barreto – Firpo (1993–1994) 
 Bimba Barrabas – Firpo (1980)
 José "Zé" Rodríguez – Acajutla (1987–1988)
 Joao Da Silva – ADET (1995–1996)
 Fernando de Moura – Firpo (1989–1992), ADET (1995–1997)
 Ned Barboza – C.D. Aguila (1986–1987)
 Eduardo Santana – C.D. Aguila (1986–1987)
 Francisco Salvador Filho – C.D. Aguila (1992–1993)
 Clarival Oliveira – C.D. Águila (1967–1968),  Sonsonate (1968-69)
 Jorge Tupinambá dos Santos – C.D. Águila (1967–1968), UES (1971-72)
 Jonás López – C.D. Águila (1967–1968)
 Ferreira da Silva – Sonsonate (1967)
 Roberto Cousanni – Sonsonate (1967)
 João Batista Nunes - Tiburones F.C.
 Mario Aparecido Baezo – Sonsonate (1967)
 Alcyr Coutinho – Sonsonate (1968), C.D. Águila (1968), UCA (1971), Atletico Marte
 Custodio Le Roy – Sonsonate
 Joao Alves – Sonsonate (1967)
 Nilton Nobrega – Sonsonate (1976-77)
 Paulo Italmir - C.D. Águila (1967)
 Edenilson Franco – Sonsonate  (1969), UES, Alianza F.C., Atletico Marte (1971)
 Odir Jacques – Sonsonate  (1968,1975-77), C.D. FAS (1968-1969), Alianza F.C., Atletico Marte (1971)
 Gerardo de Oliveira – Metapan FC (1991–1992)
 Odón da Rocha – Alianza F.C. (1978–1979)
 José Luis Januario – Alianza F.C. (1978–1980)
 Mazinho – Alianza F.C. (1979–1980)
 Carlos Alberto Lopez – Aguila (1968)
 Marco Antonio Pereira – Firpo (1982), Once Lobos (1983), C.D. Aguila (1984–1985), C.D. Chalatenango (1986–1987), C.D. Dragon (1989–1990), Metapan FC (1990-1991), Independiente FC
 Ailton Batista- Apaneca (1992–93)
 Marcos Aparecido – Apaneca (1992–1993)
 Naudemir Sales da Silva – Apaneca (1992–93)
 De Oliveira – C.D. Chalatenango (1982)
 Eraldo Correia – C.D Santiagueño (1977–1980), C.D. FAS (1981–1982), C.D. Sonsonate (1983, 1984), Firpo (1985),  Acajutla (1986–1990), Cojutepeque F.C. (1991–1992), ADET (1992–1993), C.D. Dragon (1994–1995)
 Francisco Puglio – UES
 Wendel Ramos – Fuerte San Francisco (1990), C.D. Aguila (1992), C.D. Dragon (1995)
 Juarandyr Dos Santos – Excelsior (1971), C.D. Luis Ángel Firpo (1974), Negocios Internacionales (1975–1976)
 Sebastian Pío da Silva – Firpo (1983)
 Adonis Hilario – C.D. Águila (1996)
 Alan Marcos de Queiroz – C.D. Águila  (1975–1976,78)
 Antonio David Pinho Gomes – C.D. Águila (1968–1983)
 Helio Rodriguez – Atletico Marte, Alianza F.C. (1969), UES (1972), Juventud Olímpica (1973), C.D. Águila (1974–1975)
 Zózimo – C.D. Águila (1967–1968)
 Henrique Pasiquirl - Alianza F.C. (1969)
 Gerson Enor Voss - Atletico Marte
 Nilton Rodarte – Alianza F.C. (1970-71)
 Nilton Rodarte – C.D. Águila (1995)
 Carlos Alberto - Excelsior (1971-72)
 Alvery Rodrigues Dos Santos - Atletico Marte (1992)
 Nestor Trevisan  - Alianza F.C. (1968)
 Aguinaldo Pinto de Melo - C.D. Águila (1978)
 Jorge Lopes dos Santos - C.D. Águila (1971)
 Enos Pereira - ANTEL (1974-75)
 Vermelho Rodriguez - C.D. Águila (1968)
 Carlos Roberto Barbosa - ANTEL (1976), Dragon (1977-79)
 Zezinho - Atletico Marte (1977-78)
 Figueredo - Atletico Marte (1977-78)
 Dercy Custodio - C.D. Sonsonate (1968)
 Durval Carvalho - C.D. Sonsonate (1968)
 Jurandir dos Santos - Alianza F.C. (1969), Negocios Internacionales (1974-75)
 Adilson Barbon - Alianza F.C. (1969)
 Adalto Barbosa - Alianza F.C. (1969)
 Jose Taneses - Alianza F.C. (1970-71)
 Virgilio de Camargo - Alianza F.C. (1970-71)
 Marquinho – C.D. Aguila (1981-82)
 Ze Rodriguez - Acajutla (1987)
 Jorge Linares Barbosa - Fuerte Aguilares (1976)
 Alcides de Oliveira - Metapan FC (1991)
 Mario Baesso - C.D. Sonsonate (1967-68)

Chile
 Luis Hernán Álvarez – Alianza F.C. (1966–1967)
 Jorge Amaya – C.D. Luis Ángel Firpo (1975–76)
 Juan Arrastoa - Dragon (1978)
 Manuel Baeza – Acajutla (1989–1990)
 Henry Barrientos - Dragon (1990–91)
 Wilfredo Barrientos – Izabal JC (1974), Sonsonate (1974–78), UES (1978–79)
 Juan Carlos Carreño – C.D. Aguila (1986–1988)
 Belisario Díaz – Atlético Marte (1975)
 Horacio Díaz Luco – C.D. Aguila (1974–1977)
 Julio Escobar – C.D. Luis Ángel Firpo (1967) 
 Julio Gallego – C.D. Luis Ángel Firpo (1975)
 Hernán Godoy – Alianza F.C. (1973)
 Carlos González – C.D. Luis Ángel Firpo (198?–9?) 
 Hernán Gonzáles – UES
 Miguel Hermosilla – Alianza F.C. (1965–1968, 1974)
 Enrique Iturra – Alianza F.C. (1973-74), Sonsonate (1975), Tapachulteca (1975–1976)
 Mario Iubini – Atlético Marte (1975), C.D Santiagueño (1978), Cojutepeque F.C. (1986)
 Francisco Labraña - Atlante
 José Moris – Atlético Marte (1974)
 Adolfo Olivares – Alianza F.C. (1974)
 Hugo Ottensen – Alianza F.C. (1973), Independiente (1978), C.D. Chalatenango (1979)
 Sergio Pardo – C.D Santiagueño (197?)
 Andrés Paretti – Alianza F.C. (1965–1966), C.D. Luis Ángel Firpo
 Eduardo Quintanilla – C.D. Águila (197?–1977)
 Leonardo Salas - Atlante San Alejo (1967, 1968–?), Alianza F.C. (1967–68)
 Efraín Santander -  Excelsior (1972)
 Patricio Sasmay -  Excelsior (1971), Atlético Marte (1972)
 Ricardo Sepúlveda – Alianza F.C. (1965–68), Atlético Marte (1969–71), Municipal Limeño (1972–73)
 José Sulantay – UES (1968), Atlético Marte (1969)
 Raúl Toro – Alianza F.C. (1989–90), C.D. Luis Ángel Firpo (1991–2000)
 Ricardo Toro – C.D. FAS (1994)
 Hugo Villanueva – UES (1967)

Colombia
 Juan Carlos Cachimbo – ADET (1997–1998)
 Camilo Prado –  Apaneca (1993–1994)

Paraguay
 Benigno Apodaca - UES (1972)
 Julio César Chávez – Cojutepeque (1988–1990), Firpo (1989–1990), Fuerte San Francisco (1992–1993)
 Emiliano Ramón Fernández Riera – Jose Maria Gondro (1986–1987), Metapan F.C., Firpo (1986-87)
 Luis Alberto Sosa – Metapan F.C. (1988), Firpo (1986-87, 1992–1993)
 Gervasio Martínez Canete – Metapan F.C. (1988–1992), Once Lobos (1995–1996)
 Julio Servin –  Tapachulteca (1975–1976), Sonsonate (1977)
 Nelson Brizuela – Sonsonate (1970), Excélsior F.C. (1973–1974), Municipal Limeno (1974–1975)
 Jorge Lino Romero - Atlante (1961-1962), Atletico Marte (1963)
 Domingo Irala – Firpo (1986-87)
 Venancio Zelaya - UES (1986)
 Julio Cesar Achucarro – Metapan F.C. (1988)
 Miguel Godoy Baldovinos - Aguila (1984)
 Jose Maria Gonzalez - Dragon (1989-90)

Peru
 Fernando Alva – Alianza F.C.(1975–1976), FAS (1976–1977), Once Municipal (1977–1978)
 Agustín Castillo – Atletico Marte (1990–1993), C.D. Aguila (1994–1996), C.D. FAS (1996–1997)
 Fidel Ernesto Suárez Becerra – Atlético Marte (1994)
 Juan Carlos Izquierdo – UES (1984)
 Guillermo Correa – C.D. Luis Ángel Firpo (1974)
  Manuel "Loco" Dávila – ADET (1992)
 Martín Duffú – C.D. Luis Ángel Firpo (1988–1989)
 Jesus Goyzueta – C.D. Sonsonate (1975-77)
 Miguel Seminario – C.D. Luis Ángel Firpo (1988–1989)
 José Luis Vásquez "Camote" – Atlético Balboa (1993), Atlético Marte, C.D. Chalatenango
 Wilmar Valencia – Atletico Marte (1987)
 Cesar Larrea - Alianza (1979)
 Guillermo Vargas  - Alianza (1979)
 Cesar Dinlegra – UES (1977)

Uruguay
 Fernando Currutchet – ADET (1988–1989)
 Luis Enrique Guelmo – C.D. Aguila (1987–1988), Firpo (1990–1991)
 Daniel Darío López – C.D. Aguila  1992–1993, Metapan F.C. (1991–1992)
 Jorge Leonardo Garay – C.D. Aguila  1996–1997
 Jorge Milton "Bomba" Villar – C.D. Aguila  1996–1997
 Hernán Fernando Sosa – Alianza F.C. 1986–1987
 Néstor Pereira – Alianza F.C.  (1988–1989)
 Victor de los Santos – Alianza F.C.  (1991–1992)
 Ever Mauro Jorge – Alianza F.C. (1991–1992)
 Hernán Fernando Sosa – Alianza F.C. (1993–1996)
 Washington Leonardo Rodríguez – Alianza F.C.  (1995–1996)
 Carlos Reyes – Alianza F.C. (1985–1987)
 Julio César Cortés – Alianza F.C. (1975)
 Claudio Ciccia – Alianza F.C. (1996–1998)
 Rubén Alonso – Alianza F.C., Fuerte San Francisco, Apaneca, C.D. Sonsonate, ADET, C.D. Municipal Limeño
 Richard Raffo – Apaneca (1993–1994)
 Alejandro Larrea – Atlético Marte (1994–1996)
 Jose Mario Figueroa Viscarret – Atlético Marte (1986–1987)
 José Luis González – Atletico Marte (1986–1987)
 Eduardo Lamparelli – Atletico Marte (1989–1990)
 Raúl Esnal – Atlético Marte (1985–1987), Maestranza (1987–1988), Acajutla (1988–1989), Tiburones (1989–1990), CESSA (1990), Fuerte San Francisco (1991), Cojutepeque F.C. (1992), Apaneca (1993)
 Gustavo Faral – Alianza F.C. (1986–87, 1989–1990), C.D. Dragon (1990–1991), Fuerte San Francisco (1991–1992)
 Óscar Roberto Suárez – C.D. Dragon (1995–1996)
 Carlos Villarreal – C.D. Dragon (1995–1996), C.D. FAS (1996–1997)
 Diego Aguirre – C.D. FAS (1996)
 Ademar Benítez – C.D. FAS (1986–1987)
 Héctor Cedrés – C.D. FAS (1987–1989)
 Robert Brittes  – C.D. FAS (1988–1989)
 Luis Heiman – C.D. FAS (1988–1990)
 Carlos Álvarez – C.D. FAS (1989–1990)
 Daniel Uberti – Metpan F.C. (1987), C.D. FAS (1990–1992), Atlético Marte (1996), Firpo (1997)
 Héctor Mario Molina – C.D. FAS(1991–1992)
 Gustavo Lucas – C.D. FAS (1991–1992)
 Rubén Baeque – C.D. FAS (1992–1993)
 Mauricio Silvera – C.D. FAS (1992–1993)
 Jorge Mocecchi – C.D. FAS (1995–1997)
 Julio Cesar Tejeda – C.D. FAS (1987–1988), Atletico Marte (1989), Tiburones (1992)
 José Jaureguiberry- C.D. FAS (1987)
 Eduardo Rinaldi – C.D. FAS (1989)
 Daniel Lopez – C.D. FAS (19
 Luis Carlos Sánchez – C.D. FAS (1996–1997)
 Luis Ernesto Sosa – C.D. Luis Ángel Firpo (1992–1993)
 Enrique Washington Olivera – C.D. Luis Ángel Firpo (1988–1991)
 Víctor Pereira – UES (1965–1966)
 Clemente Gusso – CESSA (1986–1988)
 Raúl "Canario" Avellaneda  – UES (1965–1966)
 Rubén Filomeno  – UES (1965–1966)
 Leonel Conde – C.D. FAS (1966–67)
 Jorge Laclau - Santiagueno (1979)
 Roberto Castelli - Juventud Olímpica
 Ademar Saccone – Atletico Marte (1966)
 Santos Claudio Gonzalez - Platense (1976)
 Albert Fay - Juventud Olimpica, Aguila (1973-74), Platense (1975-1976)
 Julio Rodriguez Silvera - Aguila (1978)
 Angel Roldan - Dragon (1978)
 Gregorio Silva - Aguila (1976), Santiagueno (1978-79)
 Miguel del Rio - Metpan F.C. (1987)
 Ruben Calixtro Sosa - Metpan F.C. (1987)
 Roberto Fernandez - Juventud Olímpica (1974-75)

North & Central America, Caribbean – CONCACAF

Costa Rica
 Javier Astua - C.D. Municipal Limeño (1996)
 Enrique Barboza - Alianza F.C. 
 Juan Gutiérrez – Alianza F.C. (1975–1976)
 Ananias Ruiz – Atlante
 Ramón Omar Zumbado – Atlético Marte, La Constancia, Atlante, C.D. FAS
 Eduardo Ramírez – Alianza F.C. (1990–1991)
 Miguel Antonio Segura Vargas – C.D. Dragon (1995–1996), C.D. Municipal Limeño (1994)
 Sergio Benavides Sánchez – Municipal Limeno (1995–1996)
 Carlos Luis Rodríguez – Municipal Limeno (1997–1998)
 Jorge Gómez McCarthy – Platense (1978–1979)
 Guido Elvido Alvarado Ulloa – Alianza F.C. (1965–1968)
 Carlos Bonilla  – Once Municipal (1948–1949)
 Oswaldo Chávez – Once Municipal (1948–1949)
 Didier Gutiérrez – Municipal Limeno(1972–1976)
 Jairo Hernandez – C.D. Dragón
  Raúl Lizano Pato – C.D. Águila (1959–1968)
 Claudio Jara – Alianza F.C. (1995)
 Justiniano Fernando Jimenez – C.D. Águila (1958–1961), C.D. FAS (1962)
 Lester Marzon – Firpo (1996)
 Allan Oviedo – C.D. FAS (1996)
 Walter Pearson Wilson – C.D. Águila (1965-66, 1968)
 Guillermo Otarola Vega – C.D. Águila (1966)
 Tarcisio Guillen – C.D. Águila (1964)
 Angel Mena – C.D. Águila (1964) 
 Eduardo Tanque Ramirez – Alianza F.C. (1991–1993)
 Adonay Salas – FAS (1964–1965), Once Municipal (1965), C.D. Sonsonate (1967–1968), Alianza (1969)
 Ramon "mon" Rodriguez – C.D. Dragón
 José Luis Soto – Atlético Marte (1965), C.D. FAS (1962–1963)
 José Elías Valenciano – UES (1968)
 Carlos Marín “Cayaca”  – C.D. FAS (1965–1969)
 Álvaro Cascante Barquero – C.D. Águila (1964-65), Leones FC (1966), C.D. Sonsonate (1968-69)
 Pedro Cubillo – C.D. Dragón, Alianza F.C.
 Floyd Guthrie – Firpo (1996)
 Ernesto Aldana – C.D. FAS (1965–66)
 Onix Vargas – C.D. FAS
 Gerardo Salazar – C.D. FAS (1968)
 Martín Jiménez – Municipal Limeno
 Oscar Jimenez Araya – C.D. Dragón
 Carl Davis - Tiburones (1995)
 Cristian Vactory – Municipal Limeno
 Guillermo Elizondio -(1965)
 Roy Saenz – UES (1974-75)
 Victor Calvo – UES (1974-75)
 Juan José ‘Turrialbeño’ López – C.D. FAS
 Walter Rubén Aldana – C.D. FAS
 Guillermo Orozco – C.D. FAS
 Luis Águila ‘Tapita’ Aguilar  – C.D. FAS
 Gilbert Solano  – C.D. FAS (1997-1998)
 Fernando Montero – Platense (1975)
 William Fisher Salgado - Tapachulteca (1975-76)
 Willian Salas - Once Municipal (1965)
 Jose Manuel Lopez Pecas - Once Municipal (1965)
 Gerardo Alfaro - Once Municipal (1965)
 Juan Manuel Lopez - Once Municipal (1965)
 Tarcisio Rodriguez - Once Municipal (1965)
 Henry Duarte - Metapan F.C. (1988)
 Manuel Pena Selva - C.D. Dragón
 Rodrigo Gallardo - Atlante (1965)
 Anarias Ruiz - Atlante (1965)
 Guillermo Valenciano - UES (1966)
 Jose Ruiz Vargas - Atletico Marte

Domican
 Wilkenson Saint Louis Pierre - Atletico Marte

Grenada
 Keith Fletcher – C.D. Águila (1996–1997)

Guatemala
 Adán Paniagua – C.D. Aguila (1985), Metapan F.C. (1986–1987)
 La Msoca Bobadilla - UCA (1985)
 Jose Medrano Castillo - C.D. Aguila 
 Julio Adán de la Roca – C.D. Chalatenango (1985)
 Miguel Ángel Pérez – C.D. FAS (1986–1987)
 Julio Rubén Flecha Paredes –  Independiente (1978–1980) 
 Jorge Fernández "Chana"  – Once Lobos (1983), Metapan F.C. (1986–1987)
 Byron Pérez – Once Lobos (1983)
 Peter Sandoval – Once Lobos (1985)
 Joaquin Álvarez – Once Lobos (1986–1987)
 Erwin Donis – Once Lobos (1986–1987)
 Vitalino García – Once Lobos (1987–1988)
 William Salgado – Tapachulteca (1975–1976)
 Tomás Gamboa – Municipal Limeno, C.D. Adler (1965), C.D. FAS (1973)
 Carlos Guerra - C.D. FAS (1955–56)
 Carlos Coyoy – Once Lobos (1985)
 Rogelio Flores – C.D. Águila (1981–1983), C.D. FAS (1983, 1988)
 Carlos Alberto Mijangos – C.D. Chalatenango (1978=1979), C.D. Platense Municipal Zacatecoluca (1975–1978), UES (1977)
 Roberto Montepeque – C.D. FAS (1987–1988)
 Hugo Peña – UES (1966)
 Julio Rodas – C.D. FAS (1995–1996)
 Oscar Sanchez "La Coneja" – C.D. Águila
 David Stokes - ADLER (1971)
 D Jerry Slusher - ADLER
 Gabriel Urriola – Atlético Marte (1956–1957)
 Bobby White – C.D. Luis Angel Firpo (1975–1976)
 Roberto Zúñiga – UES (1966), ADLER (1968)
 Luis Morales – C.D. FAS (1983)
 Jose Medrano Castillo - Aguila
 Alfredo McNish - Juventud Olimpica (1969)
 Hermes Chaz Garcia - Municipal Limeno (1974)
 Selvin Pennant - TBD
 Ricardo Tadeo - Aguila (1968), Alianza (1970-71)
 Mynor Mendez - Metapan FC

Haiti
 Jean Louis Frank Girantz – Municipal Limeno (1995–1996)

Honduras
 Juan Ramon Lagos – Once Municipal
 Francisco "El Tigre" Zamora – Alianza
 Rudy Williams – ADET (1994–1995)
 Ciro Paulino Castillo – ADET  (1997–1998)
 Julio César Arzú – ADET  (1983)
 Karl Roland – Baygon-ADET
 Mario Rosa Chávez – Atletico Marte (1955–1957)
 Jorge Armando "Tin" Martinez + – ADET (1996–1997), Aguila, C.D. Santa Clara
 Ramón Maradiaga "Primitivo" – Independiente (1983), Alianza (1985) Aguila (1986–1988)
 Juan Ramon Castro – Aguila (1994–1995)
 Patrocinio Sierra – Alianza (1988–1989)
 Pedro Cubillo – Alianza (1996–1997)
 Henry Guevara – Cojutepeque F.C. (1994–1995)
 Iván Nolasco – Cojutepeque F.C. (1994–1995), Limeno (1995–1996)
 Miguel "Gallo" Mariano – El Roble (1995–1996), FAS
 Germán Pérez – Fuerte San Francisco (1991–1992), El Roble (1994–1996)
 Cipriano Dueñas – Dragon (1990–1991)
 Carlos Ruiz  – Dragon (1995–1996)
 Héctor Amaya Fernández – Dragon (1999)
 Belarmino Rivera – FAS (1986–1987)
 Danilo Galindo – FAS(1987), Fuerte San Francisco (1991–1992)
 Jorge Martínez Ogaldes – Fuerte San Francisco (1991–1993), Limeno, El Roble (1995–1996)
 Nelín Pastore – Fuerte San Francisco (1992–1993)
 Tomás Rochez – Metapan F.C. (1988–1989)
 Raúl Centeno Gamboa – LA Firpo (1984), Metapan F.C.  (1988–1989)
 Domingo Drummond – Metapan F.C.  (1988–1989)×
 Edwin Geovanny Castro – Limeno (1993–1994)
 Jorge Ernesto Pineda – Limeno (1995–1996)
 Germán Rodríguez – Limeno (1995–1998)
 Idelfonso Mejía Bonilla – Limeno
 Francisco Javier Flores – Tiburones (1992–1995)
 Gilberto Yearwood – ADET (1992–1993)
 Manuel Larios - C.D. Aguila (1959-1960)
 Victor Zuniga - Aguila (1994–1995)
 Miguel Angel Lanza Breve - Agave (1982)
 Daniel Sambula - Agave (1982)
 Danilo Galindo – Fuerte San Francisco (1991-1992)
 Nahum Espinoza – Fuerte San Francisco (1991-1992)
 Luis Chito Reyes – Independiente  (1984)
 Mario Bonilla Pacharaca - UES (1986)
 Miguel Antonio Mathews - Aguila (1982-83)
 Roger Chavarria - TBD
 Omar Ascencio Castaneda - Acatluja
 Daniel Yanez – Dragon (1989-1990)
 Augusto Alvarez – Dragon (1966)
 Javier Padilla - El Roble (1994)
 Martin Garcia - El Roble (1995)
 Juan Cruz Murillo – LA Firpo (1984)

Mexico
 Manuel Camacho – Atlético Marte
 Nahún Corro Bazan – C.D. Aguila (1987)
 Emmanuel Valle, Dalorso – C.D. Aguila (1993–1994)
 Álex López Buenfil  – Atlético Marte

Netherlands Antilles
 Roland Albert Martell - Alianza F.C.

Nicaragua
 Rudi Sobalvarro Rivera  – C.D. Aguila (1968-69)
 Rodolfo Orellana Castro (Fito Castro) – C.D. FAS (1963–1965)
 Roger Mayorga – C.D. Águila (1969-71)

Panama
 Erick Ortega – Alianza F.C. (1988–1989), C.D. FAS (1990–1991), Fuerte San Francisco (1992–1993)
 José Alfredo Poyatos – Cojutepeque F.C. (1988–1989),(1991–1993)
 Rubén Guevara – Cojutepeque F.C. (1987–1989), Tiburones
 René Mendieta – Cojutepeque F.C. (1987–1989)
 Carlos Maldonado – Cojutepeque F.C. (1989–1990)
 Percival Piggott – Cojutepeque F.C. (1988–1990), (1992–1993)
 Patricio "Patrigol" Guevara – Cojutepeque F.C. (1991–1992)
 Noel Gutiérrez – Cojutepeque F.C. (1991–1992)
 Agustín Sánchez – UES (1978–1979)
 Daniel Montilla – UES (1978–1979)
 Jorge Méndez – UES (1978–1979), Santiagueno (1979)
 Franklin“Morocho” Delgado – Tiburones (1992–1993), Municipal Limeno (1994–1995)
 Néstor Hernández Polo – UES (1974) 
 Luis Ernesto Tapia – Atlético Marte (1970–1971), C.D. Juventud Olímpica Metalio (1972–1974), Alianza F.C. (1963–1970)
 Radamés Oriel Avila – Municipal Limeno (1994–1995)
 Erick Martinez – Municipal Limeno (1994–1995)
 Gaspar Romero - C.D. Aguila (1968)
 Guillermo Bunting – UES
 Mauricio Perez - C.D. Juventud Olímpica Metalio

United States
 Hugo Pérez – C.D. FAS (1994–1996)
 David Quezada – C.D. FAS (1996–1997)
 Robert Weavert - Alianza F.C.

Europe – UEFA

Germany
 Rugvao Leichiz – C.D. Aguila (1998)

Switzerland
 Juan Pablo Bolens - Leones de Sonsonate (1951–53)

Yugoslavia
 Vladan Vićević – C.D. Águila (1996–1998)
 Dragan Kovačević – C.D. Águila (1997)
 Vladimir Avramović  – C.D. Águila (1997)

References

External links
https://web.archive.org/web/20120928201535/http://www.elsalvador.com/noticias/2001/8/12/DEPORTES/depor5.html (Spanish) (2001 Players in the league foreign players included)
http://www.elsalvador.com/enlajugada/6edicion/nota5.html (Spanish) (foreign players in El Salvador and talks about Colombian players)
https://web.archive.org/web/20150213102820/http://www.diariocolatino.com/es/20110815/deportes/95468/Sabia-usted-que....htm?tpl=69
 https://www.diarioextra.com/Noticia/detalle/409252/ticos-en-el-fas-de-el-salvador (Costa Rican players in FAS history)

El Salvador
Primera División de Fútbol Profesional players
 
Association football player non-biographical articles